John T. Polhemus (11 September 1929 Ames, Iowa – 21 May 2013 Englewood, Colorado) was an American entomologist specialising in semi-aquatic Heteroptera. Polhemus wrote 288 peer-reviewed publications and described 474 species new to science.

Biography
Polhemus was born in the American city of Ames, Iowa, the son of George and Elsie Polhemus.

References

1929 births
2013 deaths
American entomologists